Recomposed by Peter Gregson - Bach - The Cello Suites is a 2018 album by cellist and composer Peter Gregson, released on October 19, 2018, by Deutsche Grammophon. The album is a recomposition and reinterpretation of Bach's Cello Suites.

References

2018 albums
Deutsche Grammophon albums
Classical albums